The Snipe North American Championship is the annual North American Championship for sailing in the Snipe class.

The regatta is open to Snipe Class International Racing Association (SCIRA) registered boats and class member skippers and crews, and the following trophies are awarded:
Birney Mills Memorial Trophy to the winning Skipper from a qualified North American Country.
Kim Thompson Memorial Trophy to the winning crew from a qualified North American Country.
Chuck Loomis Trophy to the top Junior (Skipper or Crew will not have reached the age of 20 by December 31 of the year in which the event is sailed) team from a qualified North American Country. If no boat/team competes where both skipper and crew are junior sailors, the top placing junior skipper, or the top placing junior crew if no junior skipper racing.

It is held every year alternating venues around any country in North America. 3 races constitute a regatta.

2017 winners were Rodriguez and Kathleen Tocke.

Winners

^In 1997, due to wind conditions, only 2 races were completed and the regatta was not valid.
^^In 2001, Birney Mills Memorial Trophy and Kim Thompson Memorial Trophy went to Bill Hardesty and Jon Rogers (USA), as regatta winners were not from a qualified North American Country.

References 

Snipe competitions
North American international sports competitions
North America and Caribbean championships in sailing
Recurring sporting events established in 1973